Nate Kelley (born February 15, 1978 in Rockford, Illinois) is the original drummer and backing vocalist for the progressive rock band Shabutie (now called Coheed and Cambria). He is credited on the songs "Delirium Trigger" and "33" from Coheed and Cambria's First album. Kelley, along with Claudio Sanchez, Travis Stever and Jon Carleo formed the band Beautiful Loser in 1995, which later became Shabutie after Stever left. Kelley left Shabutie in February 2000. He currently performs with two bands: Laterals and The Noise (with former Misfits drummer Googy).

References

Coheed and Cambria members
American rock drummers
Living people
1978 births
20th-century American drummers
American male drummers
21st-century American drummers